

Terrestrial
Italy is in the Palearctic realm Ecoregions are listed by biome. 

Temperate coniferous forests
Alps conifer and mixed forests

Temperate broadleaf and mixed forests
Po Basin mixed forests
Apennine deciduous montane forests
Dinaric Mountains mixed forests

Mediterranean forests, woodlands, and shrub
Italian sclerophyllous and semi-deciduous forests
South Apennine mixed montane forests
Tyrrhenian-Adriatic sclerophyllous and mixed forests
Northeastern Spain and Southern France Mediterranean forests
Illyrian deciduous forests

Freshwater
 Gulf of Venice Drainages
 Italian Peninsula & Islands

Marine
Italy's territorial waters are in the Temperate Northern Atlantic marine realm, and Mediterranean Sea marine province.
 Adriatic Sea
 Ionian Sea
 Western Mediterranean

 
ecoregions
Italy